Miltoncross Academy (formerly Miltoncross School) is a coeducational secondary school located in the Milton area of Portsmouth in the English county of Hampshire.

The school is situated on the site of the former Priorsdean Hospital for infectious diseases, which was established in 1884. Miltoncross School opened on a different site in Penhale Road in September 1999, but did not move to the building it is housed in until 2000. Previously a community school administered by Portsmouth City Council, Miltoncross school converted to academy status on 1 November 2014 and was renamed Miltoncross Academy. The school is sponsored by The Kemnal Academies Trust, but continues to coordinate with Portsmouth City Council for admissions. The first headteacher was David Throp, who left after one and a half years; Tim Stokes was then interim head, succeeded by Barry Gransden, then Neil Mcleod, Fiona Calerbank and Nick Giles.  The remaining original staff members are Joe Mersey who is the academy's  SENCo and Catherine Canham who is the laboratory technician.  Other longstanding members of staff include deputy headteacher Debra Mason, technology teacher Tony Hobbs, head of PE Ben Andrews, languages teacher Nadia Quereshi and Sam Tuck who is a teaching assistant.

References

External links
Miltoncross Academy official website

Secondary schools in Portsmouth
Educational institutions established in 1999
1999 establishments in England
Academies in Portsmouth